Saul Akkemay (born 14 October 1964), better known by the pen name Panbello, is a Belgian-born freelance publicist and columnist, of German-Jewish paternal descent.

He writes reviews and columns for several magazines, mostly essays on the Jewish contribution to Film Noir.

Early life
Saul Akkemay was born in 1964 in Ghent, the capital of the Belgian province East Flanders, the Dutch-speaking (northern) part of Belgium.

He grew up in a liberal family and attended the Grammar school in his hometown. After his graduation he attended the Ghent University. However, the university was much criticised by Akkemay and he left the faculty Press and Communication Sciences in 1985 without a degree.

Works
 2003–04 High Heels on a Wet Pavement : the Jewish Contribution to Film Noir (essays);
 2004 Better Late than Dead (crime novel);

External links
 Centre for Historical Research and Documentation War and Contemporary Society
 Panbello WeB NoiR
 Panbello's MySpace Page
 The Noir Connection
 V.V.O.J.
 The Originals

1964 births
21st-century Belgian journalists
Male journalists
Belgian Jews
Belgian columnists
Belgian film critics
Belgian people of German-Jewish descent
Living people